The 1962 All-Ireland Minor Football Championship was the 31st staging of the All-Ireland Minor Football Championship, the Gaelic Athletic Association's premier inter-county Gaelic football tournament for boys under the age of 18.

Cork entered the championship as defending champions, however, they were defeated by Kerry in the Munster final.

On 23 September 1962, Kerry won the championship following a 6-5 to 0-7 defeat of Mayo in the All-Ireland final. This was their sixth All-Ireland title overall and their first in 12 championship seasons.

Results

Connacht Minor Football Championship

Quarter-Final

Mayo 3-13 Sligo 0-10.

Semi-Finals

Mayo 7-1 Roscommon 0-7.

Galway 7-8 Leitrim 0-10

Final

Munster Minor Football Championship

Leinster Minor Football Championship

Ulster Minor Football Championship

All-Ireland Minor Football Championship

Semi-Finals

Mayo 2-12 Down 1-9 Croke Park August 19th. 

Final

References

1962
All-Ireland Minor Football Championship